Joachim Burmeister (1564 in Lüneburg – 5 May 1629 in Rostock) was a north German composer and music theorist.

He was the oldest of five children born to a beadworker and townsman of Lüneburg. His brother Anton (d. 1634) became the cantor of St. Michaelis, Lüneburg, following Christian Praetorius.

Burmeister attended the University of Rostock, where he received the master's degree and became cantor at the Nicolaikirche and St. Mary's Church, Rostock. He then taught grammar, Latin, rhetoric and poetry at the Rostock Gymnasium (Scholae Rostochiensis Collega Classicus).
His aim while publishing his books was to prove that music was an art full of dignity, like eloquence.
In Musica autoschédiastikè and Musica Poetica Burmeister provided a list of musical soloecisms, musical ornaments or figures, parts of the musical poem and musical styles. He inquired about rhetorical convenience and pronunciation of music.
Burmeister was a very literate writer, his books show his mastery of Greek and Latin and contain references for example to Erasmus, Melanchthon, .

Works
 1601 published a collection of four-voiced psalms.
 1605 published in Rostock a German-language comedy titled "Christ Revealed" (Χριστὸς πεφασμένος, der geoffenbarte Christus, Comödia), available online.
 1606 published "Musica poetica," in which he explains his musical-rhetorical figure theory, available online.
 1609 issued "Musica mathematica" by Heinrich Brucaeus (1531–1593) under the title "Musica theorica".

References

 Agathe Sueur, Vie de Joachim Burmeister, Paris, Rhuthmos, 2019.
 Joachim Burmeister, Poétique musicale. Suivi de David Chytraeus – De la Musique, French translation, notes and lexicon by Agathe Sueur et Pascal Dubreuil, Paris, Rhuthmos, 2017.
 Joachim Burmeister, Musica poetica (1606) augmentée des plus excellentes remarques tirées de Hypomnematum musicae poeticae (1599) et de Musica autoschédiastikè (1601), introduction, Latin text and French translation, notes and lexicon by Agathe Sueur and Pascal Dubreuil, Wavre, Mardaga, 2007. Preview of this book online
 Agathe Sueur, "La grande éloquence musicale: lamprophonie et chalcophonie chez Joachim Burmeister (1564–1629)", Rhetorica: A Journal of the History of Rhetoric, Vol. 36 No. 2, Spring 2018, pp. 132-159.
 Martin Ruhnk: Joachim Burmeister: ein Beitrag zur Musiklehre um 1600. Bärenreiter-Verl., Kassel 1955. Schriften des Landesinstituts für Musikforschung, Kiel, Bd.5.
 Arrey von Dommer, Wilhelm Scherer: Burmeister, Joachim. In: Allgemeine Deutsche Biographie (ADB). Band 3, Duncker & Humblot, Leipzig 1876, S. 628 f.
 Hans-Heinrich Unger: Burmeister, Joachim. In: Neue Deutsche Biographie (NDB). Band 3, Duncker & Humblot, Berlin 1957, S. 54.
 Ralf Böckmann: Burmeister, Joachim. In: Biographisch-Bibliographisches Kirchenlexikon (BBKL). Band 32, Nordhausen 2011,  (Gekürzte Onlinefassung).

External links

 

1566 births
1629 deaths
People from Lüneburg
German poets
Writers from Lower Saxony
German classical composers
German music theorists
Renaissance composers
German male poets
German male classical composers